Naho Hoshiyama (born 25 December 1980) is a Japanese gymnast. She competed in six events at the 1996 Summer Olympics.

References

External links
 

1980 births
Living people
Japanese female artistic gymnasts
Olympic gymnasts of Japan
Gymnasts at the 1996 Summer Olympics
Gymnasts from Tokyo
20th-century Japanese women